Eagle's Nest, also known indigenously as Tsim Shan, is a hill north of Cheung Sha Wan of Hong Kong. The hill peaks at 305 metres and is within Sha Tin District with border to Sham Shui Po District at her south. The hill is located northeast of Piper's Hill and northwest of Crow's Nest.

Conservation
The steep north face of Beacon Hill, together with a valley to the north-east of Eagle's Nest, covering a total area of 53.2 hectares, was designated as a Site of Special Scientific Interest in 1979.

Access
Eagle's Nest Nature Trail goes around her peak while the Stage 5 of MacLehose Trail runs on her north.

Transport

The hill is the site of Eagle's Nest Tunnel, a major infrastructure project in the area.

References

See also
List of mountains, peaks and hills in Hong Kong
Sha Tin Heights

Mountains, peaks and hills of Hong Kong
Cheung Sha Wan
Sha Tin District
Sham Shui Po District